Liden is a locality situated in Sundsvall Municipality, Västernorrland County, Sweden with 254 inhabitants in 2010.

It is located near the river Indalsälven, 50 km (road 86) north west of the city of Sundsvall.

The name Liden (Swedish; meaning "a long slope", down to the river) was first recorded as De Lidh in a letter from 1344,
Liden's Old Church was built in the 1480s by the Dominican friar Josefhus.

The Swedish noble family Lidströmer originates from Liden.

The New Church, which was consecrated  in 1858, is situated a few hundred meters above the Old Church.

References 

Populated places in Sundsvall Municipality
Medelpad